The Whole World's Rotten is the third studio album by American rap duo DFC from Flint, Michigan. It was released on November 25, 1997 through Big Beat Records with distribution via Tommy Boy Records. Recording sessions took place at D.A.R.P. Studios in Atlanta and at Music Annex in Palo Alto. Production was handled by seven record producers: Jazze Pha, Gentry "Black Jack" Reed, MC Eiht of Compton's Most Wanted, Erotic D, "G-Man" Stan Keith, Colin Wolfe and the group's frequent collaborator MC Breed. It features guest appearances from MC Breed, MC Eiht, Jazze Pha, The D.O.C., Big Zack, Trauma Black and N.O.T.R.

The album did not match the success of their previous effort, only making it to 92 on the Billboard's Top R&B/Hip-Hop Albums. Its lead single, "Listen (Five Minutes)", which used a sample of Kool & the Gang's "Summer Madness", was a minor hit on the Hot R&B/Hip-Hop Songs and Hot Rap Songs charts, peaking at #85 and #18.

Track listing

Charts

References

External links

1997 albums
DFC (group) albums
Big Beat Records (American record label) albums
Albums produced by Jazze Pha
Albums produced by MC Eiht